Nicholas Fekete (born August 5, 1962) is a Canadian modern pentathlete. He competed at the 1988 Summer Olympics.

References

External links
 

1962 births
Living people
Canadian male modern pentathletes
Olympic modern pentathletes of Canada
Modern pentathletes at the 1988 Summer Olympics
Sportspeople from Montreal